Bantayan Island is an island located in the Visayan Sea, Philippines. It is situated to the west of the northern end of Cebu island, across the Tañon Strait.

The island is administratively divided into three municipalities:
Bantayan (the largest municipality, covering the central part)
Madridejos (covering the northern portion)
Santa Fe (center of tourism in Bantayan Island, covering the southeastern portion)

Geography

Island group

Bantayan is the main and largest island of the Bantayan island group that lies close to the geographical center of the Philippine archipelago.

The island group includes numerous smaller islands (some uninhabited or uninhabitable), mostly around the southwest corner of the island. The islands are beside the busy shipping lanes for ships and ferries coming from Mindanao or Cebu City on their way to Manila. The islands are all small and green and low, virtually indistinguishable one from another.

Some of the more notable are:

NB In addition, Guintacan Island (or Kinatarkan, Batbatan) to the northeast is part of Santa Fe municipality although it is not part of the Bantayan islands group archipelago.

Demographics

Language

The Bantayanon language is mostly a mixture of different neighbouring Visayan languages: The principally native Cebuano (from Cebu and Eastern Negros) and Hiligaynon (from Western Negros and Iloilo), Boholano (from Bohol), Masbateño (from Masbate) and Waray-Waray (from Leyte and Samar).  However it has its own words such as "kakyop" (yesterday), "sara" (today) and "buwas" (tomorrow).

Climate

The climate is typically equatorial – temperature range over the year is less than three degrees Celsius ( deg F), and annual rainfall exceeds .  January to April inclusive are less wet than the other months.  This supports at least two rice crops per year.  The climate in Bantayan falls within Coronas climate type IV, characterised by not very pronounced maximum rainfall with a short dry season from one to three months and a wet season of nine to ten months. The dry season starts in February and lasts through April sometimes extending to midMay.

Bantayan has a tropical climate. Most months of the year are marked by significant rainfall. The short dry season has little impact. This location is classified as Am (Tropical monsoon climate) by Köppen–Geiger climate classification system.

Geology
Like most of Cebu province, the lithology of the island consists of two unit types:
As a consequence of the geology, water supplies are hard.

National protected areas

Bantayan and its surrounding islands have been included in several pieces of legislation giving protected status.

Wilderness area
In 1981 President Marcos signed proclamation no. 2151 giving certain parts of the country protected status. Eleven years later the Philippine Congress passed Republic Act 7586 – the National Integrated Protected Areas System (NIPAS) Act of 1992, managed by the Department of Environment and Natural Resources (DENR) – which reaffirmed the protected status.

After 2013's Typhoon Yolanda, there has naturally been a need and desire for reconstruction, however one major problem is that because of the designation, there is little land titling, and international relief organizations (and others) are reluctant to fund construction on land where title does not exist.  the start of initiatives to define the area, and to devise a general plan for its management (BIWA-GMP). From that has arisen a more concrete proposal regarding reclassification.  the plan is to be recommended to Congress.

Tourist zone and marine reserve
Presidential proclamation no. 1801 of 1978 established Tourist zones and marine reserves, and placed the island of Hilutungan within its scope.

Protected seascape
The Tañon Strait protected seascape was established by President Ramos under proclamation no. 1234 of 1998. , 17 years after its declaration, the first summit on the Tañon Strait protected seascape is to be held.

Agriculture
The dominant uncultivated vegetation is ipil-ipil (Leucaena leucocephala).  Cultivated crops include coconut, cassava, banana, sugarcane, corn and mango.

The principal cash crops are:

Fauna
The common wolf snake can occasionally be found on the island.

Avifauna
The following list shows birds whose presence has been verified.

The sea
 The coast of Bantayan and its islands mostly alternates between mangal and palm trees.  Because of the shallow slope on the shelf, the intertidal area can be quite extended, leading to rocky and muddy shallows at low tide.  This means that places with a sandy shore – a beach – are infrequent. Good beaches can be found in the southeast around Santa Fe, and in the northwest at Patao and Madridejos.  Even these though are not cleaned, and depending on the currents there can be considerable amounts of flotsam and jetsam on the beach and in the sea.

Coral
Of the approximately 500 varieties of coral known worldwide, about 400 are found in the Philippines.  However their future is seriously threatened – mainly due to destructive fishing techniques, such as blast fishing and cyanide fishing, which indiscriminately destroy much of the ecosystem, including the coral reefs.  In addition, global warming and ocean acidification also contribute significantly to worldwide loss.  Globally coral sees 50%–70% threatened or lost; southeast Asian coral reefs are in even worse condition, and it is estimated in the Philippines the figure under threat is greater than 90%, with less than 1% in good condition.  Until now proper compliance of international laws has been poor, although it is starting to be taken seriously.  Meanwhile, other efforts are under way in Bantayan to accelerate the regrowth, using coral farms.

Starfish

There are many starfish to be seen in the intertidal area. Their detrivorous diet helps keep the water clean.  Further out though, the crown-of-thorns starfish is a considerable threat to the coral reef, because of its voracious hunger for the coral.

Mangal
Mangroves are salt-tolerant, woody, seed-bearing plants that are found in tropical and subtropical areas where they are subject to periodic tidal inundation. The Philippines has over 40 species of mangroves and is one of the most biodiverse regions in the world as there are only about 70 species of mangroves worldwide. The mangrove ecosystem is a very diverse one and is home to many birds, fish, mammals, crustaceans and other animals.

Mangroves provide an important nursery for fish, shellfish and other organisms. It is estimated that each hectare of mangrove can provide food for 1,000 kg of marine organisms.  With this abundance of food for fish present in the mangroves, each hectare of mangal yields 283.5 metric tons of fish per year. Mangroves also provide other important functions such as preventing soil erosion and protecting shoreline from typhoons and strong waves. Mangroves provide many other products and services such as medicines, alcohol, housing materials and are an area for research and tourism.

However even with all of these known benefits the state of mangroves within the Philippines is very dim. Many of the mangrove areas were destroyed to make way for fishponds and reclamation areas. They were used indiscriminately for housing – both building materials and reclamation – and were disturbed by siltation and pollution.

Now that the true benefit of these ecosystems is known there is protection and rehabilitation of these important ecosystems. It is now illegal to cut down mangroves for any purpose and local governments and community organizations have taken active roles in planting and managing mangrove plantations. There is hope that in the future mangroves will return to the healthy status that they once held.

History

Early origins
There are almost no physical records nor evidence to indicate when the first people came to Bantayan, nor their places of origin.  Some believe they can be traced back to Panay, others believe that the bulk of them were of Cebuano origin, and still others say they came from Leyte and Bohol.

Connections between Bantayan and other places can be deduced from the mixed dialects spoken by the people, and their ancient culture such as clothweaving, dance, and architecture. In addition certain old-established Hispanic family names are associated with certain locations:
 Panay
 
 Cebu
 
 Leyte
 
 Bohol
 
 Paraguay
 

There is little documentary evidence of life and culture before the arrival of the Spanish conquistadores.  What we know of them is gathered from handed-down accounts and folklore.

The early people were said to be timid. They did not travel and knew little of places away from their homes. They wore little clothing because the climate did not need it. The abundance of fish, wild game, wild fruits and tuber, such as ba-ay, hagmang, bailacog, and kiot, made the people do little more than make clearings on which to plant corn, camote (sweet potato) and other vegetables. Large and small trees grew and spread, shading the ground all year round with their heavy foliage. Vines and creepers climbed the trees hanging from bough to bough; cultivation of open land was difficult.

The Spanish period

Early years
During the period 1565–1898 the Philippines was a Spanish colony, part of the Spanish East Indies.

The parish church was established in 1580 – as an encomienda of the heir of Don Pedro de Gamboa.

Writing in 1582, Miguel de Loarca stated: 

He also wrote:

Writing in 1588, Domingo de Salazar reported: "The island of Bantayan is small and densely populated. It has more than eight hundred tributarios, most of them Christians. The Augustinians who had them in charge have abandoned them also, and they are now without instruction. This island is twenty leagues from Zubu."

Some time in 1591, Bantayan's population totalled 683 tributes representing 6732 persons.

Writing in 1630, Fray Juan de Medina noted:

He goes on to say: "This island has a village called , which it is said was the source of all the Bisayan Indians who have peopled these shores, and whose language resembles that of Hilingigay."

Derivation of name
During the time of 22nd Governor-General Sebastián Hurtado de Corcuera, the Visayans were continually harassed by Moro pirates who came on raids to capture slaves. Consequently, tall stone walls and watchtowers were built in different parts of the archipelago, for refuge and protection from Moro aggression.

Popular folklore says that these watchtowers were known locally as "Bantayan sa Hari", meaning "Watchtowers of the King", and they served as lookout towers for incoming vintas (Moro pirate vessels). In the course of their vigil, it became common to say, "Bantayan! Bantayan!", meaning, "Keep watch! Keep watch!", and that was how this island-group got its name.

However Madridejos history scholar Eng'r. Brient Mangubat who has studied Bantayan Island History and the Lawis Old Fort foundation in Madridejos claimed that the origin of the Island's name Bantayan has nothing to do with the Muslim raiders. According to him the Island got its name Bantayan way back in the year 1574, when  the Island's northern side (LAWIS), was used as a "Lookout post" to monitor the Visayan Sea against Chinese attacks. The residents of Bantayan Island decided to do this precautionary act as Manila,, the country's capital city was under attack by the forces led by Limahong. The Island's name (Bantayan) was already in use 25 years earlier, before the (first) Muslim raid took place on Bantayan Island in year 1600.

 
In all there were 18 watchtowers built on the Bantayan islands. Most have not survived, although relics can be seen to this day. That at Madridejos is in fair condition, that at Santa Fe less so. There is a particularly fine example on Doong island 

Construction of watchtowers was not limited to Bantayan. Watchtowers were built in many locations in Cebu vulnerable to Moro raids, as well as in other parts of the Visayas, such as Southern Leyte, Northern Samar and Bohol. See for example:Alegria·Aloguinsan·Daanbantayan·Boljoon·Mandaue·Oslob·Samboan·Tingko Beach

In his "Statement of the Annual Incomes and Sources of Profit of His Majesty in These Philipinas Islands" for the year 1608, Pedro de Caldierva de Mariaca declares the tributes (tax) from Bantayan and Bohol combined amount to 2400 gold pesos.

Industry
Don José Basco y Vargas was Governor-General of the Philippines from July 1778 until September 1787. During his period in office, he pioneered many projects for the encouragement of agriculture and industries. However many small industries in the islands were completely abandoned because the people were forced to work on building roads, public buildings and churches. Those enforcing were called politas.

The abundance of fish, favourable climate and virgin soil then greatly determined the occupation of the people. These geographical factors became strong stimuli for the people to be fishermen, farmers and sailors. Much later, the small clearings were expanded to fields.

The old Spanish roads connecting Santa Fe, Bantayan, and Madridejos were constructed chiefly through the services of labour and partly supported by the tribute funds.

Religion
When the Spaniards came to Bantayan, the people already had some form of religious convictions and worship, such as animism, shamanism, evocation and magic. They easily conceived the idea of evil spirits, good spirits, witches and ghosts. In order to please these imaginary creatures people often resorted to charms, vows, sacrifices and self-harm.  It was a common belief among the illiterate people of the past that cholera and other fatal diseases were caused by poison which an evil spirit had put into the wells and that the people could be saved from the dreaded disease only by chanting prayer and holding processions.

The cooperation between the church and the state did not last very long. Quarrels between the church and the state ensued. There was struggle for political power, from the Governor-General down to the alcalde mayors on one hand and from the archbishop to the friars on the other. Because of this, projects for improvements were all paralysed.

The American period
On January 4, 1899, following the defeat of Spain in the Spanish–American War, a new government was born to the Philippines. With instructions from President McKinley, General Otis, who commanded the US Army in the Philippines, declared that the American sovereignty must be recognized without condition. This was the beginning of the American period.

This island-group did not take any active part in the revolution against Spain or America. However, after the Filipino–American War, a reactionary group was organized, headed by Patorete of Santa Fe, then still a barrio of Bantayan. This resulted in great fear and tension among the inhabitants.

The condition of the barrios, after the overthrow and immediately preceding the arrival of the Americans, in general, was very far from satisfactory. Sanitation was entirely a stranger; barrio life was dreadful. There were few signs of improvement among the people since their primitive ancestors.

The subdivision of the province of Cebu was developed utilizing the method introduced by Spain. A new provincial law had been enacted in 1895 and necessary appointments were then made. At that time, Bantayan was already organized as pueblo. Santa Fe was organized as such in 1911 and Madridejos in 1917. These pueblos were given a new corporate form under the Municipal Council chosen by a limited native electorate. For the local head of the administration, the title Presidente took the place of the former Gobernadorcillo or Capitan

Committed to the task of administering the newly organized municipal governments were the first presidentes of the three towns comprising the island-group namely:  for Bantayan,  for Madridejos and Casimiro Batiancila for Santa Fe. Political parties were formally organized since the early days of the American regime. Partido Liberal came towards the end of 1900. Pascual Poblete founded the Partido Independista in 1902.

During the administration of Governor-General Luke E. Wright (1904–1906), the public road policy was inaugurated. Little by little the stage trails were changed to roads of more durable construction. Late in 1913 the construction of Santa Fe—Bantayan road began and in 1918 the Bantayan—Madridejos road followed; both were completed in 1924.

Then and now, fishing and farming were important industries of the people, but from the year 1903 to 1925, weaving of piña cloth and the gathering of maguey fibre were very lucrative pursuits of the people. Over the years demand for these products weakened and died out. At about the same, hand embroidery termed as "spare time industry" came in. A good number of women adopted it and were actively engaged in it for some years. The local output was quite significant. In 1923, because of weak and unsettled market conditions, particularly in Manila, the business gradually disappeared.

Independent Philippines
Gregorio Zaide described the Philippine national characteristic as "pliant, like bamboo, bending in the wind without breaking". This might explain the war-time actions of the then mayor Isidro Escario, who had himself rowed out to meet a fleet of Japanese warships where he treated with them: Bantayan was not invaded and the war basically passed it by.

Economy

Commerce

Bantayan islands are considered Cebu's fishing ground from where boatloads of fish – guinamos (salted fish) and buwad (dried fish) – are transported daily to Cebu and Negros for consumption and further distribution to as far as Manila and Mindanao. Equally important is the thriving poultry industry with hundreds of thousands of chicken eggs produced daily.

Years ago, poultry raising was mainly a backyard affair. Today it has grown into a large scale and highly specialized industry. Big poultry farms are located near the national and feeder roads. Over one million chickens are kept in yards and specially constructed barns with more than half a million eggs gathered every day. These eggs are exported to Cebu, Manila, and Mindanao and other towns and cities in the Visayas. This industry, along with copra making, tubâ gathering and fishing, has helped Bantayan solve its unemployment problem.

Transport
The island can be reached via ferry services from Hagnaya (San Remigio) to Santa Fe, and from Estancia, Iloilo and Sagay to Bantayan municipal port. Bantayan Airport handles infrequent flights from chartered planes usually arriving from Mactan–Cebu International Airport.

Goods are shipped through Bantayan municipal port.  There is also a small dock in Baigad capable of handling small pumpboats.  However it is in a very poor state of repair, and hasn't handled any vessel since 2007.

There are three lightstations around the islands:

Society

Health care
In view of the relatively high population of the island, and its growing popularity as a tourist spot, a bill has already been presented in Congress for the establishment of a 100bed tertiarylevel hospital. Currently the nearest available tertiary care is in Cebu City, four hours travel by land and sea.  Even the level1 facility available in Bogo takes at least 1½ hours travel.

Education

The first school in Bantayan, called the "Gabaldon School", opened in 1915.

Public high schools on Bantayan are located in the municipalities of Bantayan, Santa Fe and Madridejos as well as on Doong island. There are also private high schools and tertiary colleges such as Bantayan Southern Institute and Salazar College. St Paul Academy (SPA) is a private high school in Bantayan municipality.

Sport
As is common through the Philippines, 'sport' is synonymous with cockfighting.  It is an unusual sport in that the winner dies as well as the loser.  Large sums are bet on the outcome of a fight, which usually lasts little more than one minute.

The birds themselves can look magnificent for their few brief moments of stardom, with purple-black plumage and a gold ruff.

There are several sports centers (cockpits) on the island.  Smaller puroks just have an open-air arena.

Notable dates

Notes

References

Sources

 

 

 
 

 .  and 
 
 
 

 
 
 
 
 
 
 
 
 
 
 

Islands of Bantayan
Beaches of the Philippines
Tourist attractions in Cebu
Wilderness areas of the Philippines